EgyptAir Flight 181 was a domestic passenger flight from Borg El Arab Airport in Alexandria, Egypt, to Cairo International Airport. On 29 March 2016 the flight was hijacked by an Egyptian man claiming to wear an explosive belt and forced to divert to Larnaca International Airport in Cyprus. Most passengers and crew were released by the hijacker shortly after landing. The hijacker surrendered about seven hours later, and everybody escaped from the aircraft unharmed. The belt was later revealed to have contained mobile phones and no explosives. The aircraft involved in the incident was an EgyptAir Airbus A320-200.

Hijacking
Flight 181 departed Borg El Arab Airport in Alexandria at 06:38 local time (UTC+2) for a short flight to Cairo International Airport, carrying 56 passengers plus seven crew. After takeoff, the captain was informed that a passenger claiming to be wearing an explosive belt was demanding that the aircraft be flown to Cyprus. A passenger later reported that, during the flight, the flight attendants collected the passengers' passports, which was unusual for a domestic flight but common during a hijacking. The plane then started gaining altitude, and it was announced that they were diverting to Larnaca. The aircraft safely landed at Larnaca International Airport at 08:46 local time (UTC+3), and stopped in a remote parking area. The airport was then closed to all incoming and outgoing traffic.

Resolution
After landing at Larnaca, negotiations began and everyone on board was freed except three passengers and four crew. The hijacker later demanded to see his estranged wife, living in Cyprus, and sought asylum in the country. He also gave police a letter addressed to his former wife. Cypriot state media said that the hijacker wanted the release of female prisoners in Egypt, and, according to Egyptian officials, he had been asking to speak to European Union officials.

Seven more people later exited the plane via the stairs, and a crew member climbed down from a cockpit window. At 14:41 local time, the Cypriot foreign ministry tweeted that the hijacking was over, and the hijacker had been arrested. None of the passengers or crew were harmed. In an earlier tweet, the ministry identified the hijacker as Seif Eldin Mustafa, an Egyptian national.

Later in the day, a photo was circulated of a passenger seen smiling beside Mustafa, whose supposed explosive belt was visible underneath his coat. The passenger was later identified as Ben Innes, and the photo went viral. A security expert described Innes's actions as irresponsible and one University of Cambridge psychologist said Innes might have been driven by "pure narcissism", explaining that social media lacks the checks and balances of older forms of communication.

As a result of security concerns, officials at Cairo International Airport delayed the departure of a flight bound for John F. Kennedy International Airport in New York City.

Passengers and crew
There were six Egyptian crew members and one Egyptian security official aboard Flight 181. Of the 56 passengers, 30 were Egyptian, 14 were European, and 8 were from the United States. Opera singer Farrah el-Dibany was a passenger on this flight.

Aircraft
The aircraft involved was an Airbus A320-233 registered as SU-GCB, MSN 2079. Its first flight was on 8 July 2003, it was delivered to EgyptAir on 31 October 2003 and was twelve years old at the time of the hijacking.

Perpetrator 
After being detained, Seif Eldin Mustafa was held in custody in Cyprus. The government of Egypt and Cyprus stated their intentions for him to be extradited for prosecution in Egypt. A legal process took place in Cyprus as a court order is required for extradition. An original verdict in support of extradition was appealed by Mustafa, on the grounds of human rights risks in Egypt. Mustafa was eventually extradited to Egypt, where he was tried, convicted, and sentenced to life imprisonment.

See also
 EgyptAir Flight 321 – EgyptAir flight hijacked in 1976
 EgyptAir Flight 648 – EgyptAir flight hijacked in 1985
 EgyptAir Flight 804 – Another EgyptAir A320 aircraft; it crashed less than two months after this A320 was hijacked.
 Afriqiyah Airways Flight 209 – Afriqiyah Airways flight hijacked in 2016
 Egyptian raid on Larnaca International Airport – failed Egyptian attempt to intervene in a hostage stand-off at Larnaca International Airport in 1978
 List of aircraft hijackings
 Accidents and incidents involving the Airbus A320 family

References

External links
 "Egyptair flight Ms181." EgyptAir.

2016 in Cyprus 
2016 crimes in Egypt
Accidents and incidents involving the Airbus A320
Aircraft hijackings
Aviation accidents and incidents in 2016
Aviation accidents and incidents in Cyprus
Aviation accidents and incidents in Egypt
181
Larnaca
March 2016 events in Egypt
March 2016 crimes in Africa
2016 disasters in Cyprus 
2016 in Egypt 
2016 disasters in Egypt